Nicoreni is a village in Drochia District, Moldova. At the 2004 census, the commune had 3,420 inhabitants.

References

Villages of Drochia District